The House of Schleswig-Holstein-Sonderburg-Wiesenburg was one of the many cadet branches of the House of Schleswig-Holstein-Sonderburg, itself a junior line of the Oldenburg dynasty.
Although the members possessed the title of duke in Denmark and in the Holy Roman Empire, they held property in and derived income from allotted sections of the Duchy of Schleswig-Holstein, but sovereignty over these lands remained in the authority of their pater familias, the king of Denmark.

Background 
The founder of the line was Philip Louis (1620–1689). He purchased the Amt of Wiesenburg in the Erzgebirgskreis in Saxony, including a castle, town and 18 villages in 1664 from John George II, Elector of Saxony, but without any sovereign privileges. He made what initially appeared to be a failing investment in the mining industry in Schneeberg and Neustädtel. But in the 1670s he made large profits and became a wealthy mining entrepreneur. In 1686, Philip Louis bought Oberkotzau in Franconia from  Christian Ernst, Margrave of Brandenburg-Bayreuth. He died in 1689 in Oberkotzau.

His son Frederick was unhappily married with Karolina of Legnica-Brieg (1652–1707) until she divorced him in 1680. He sold Wiesenburg in 1723 to his only son Leopold (1674–1744), who sold it shortly after Frederick's death. Duke Leopold had reverted to Catholicism, and married Princess Marie Elisabeth of Liechtenstein (1683–1744). He was a secret Imperial Councillor and Knight of the Order of the Golden Fleece (Nr.648). He had five daughters and no male heirs. The line of Schleswig-Holstein-Sonderburg-Wiesenburg died out with Duke Leopold.

List of Dukes

References

Bibliography 
 Carsten Porskrog Rasmussen, E. Imberger, D. Lohmeier, I. Mommsen (eds.): Die Fürsten des Landes. Herzöge und Grafen von Schleswig-Holstein und Lauenburg, Wachholtz Verlag, Neumünster, 2008,

External links 
 The House of Schleswig-Holstein-Sonderburg-Wiesenburg
 Story about the Wiesenburg

German noble families
Sonderburg-Wiesenburg